The 2019–20 Coupe de France preliminary rounds, Normandy was the qualifying competition to decide which teams from the leagues of the Normandy region of France took part in the main competition from the seventh round.

A total of eight teams qualified from the Normandy preliminary rounds. In 2018–19 none of the teams that qualified progressed beyond the eighth round.

Schedule
The first round of the qualifying competition took place on the weekend of 24 August. A total of 284 teams participated in the first round from Régionale 3 (tier 8) and below. 11 Régionale 3 teams were given byes to the second round, and entered at that stage with all 40 Régional 2 (tier 7) teams and all 19 Régionale 1 (tier 6) teams.

The third round draw took place on 4 September 2019. The ten Championnat National 3 (tier 5) teams entered at this stage.

The fourth round draw took place on 19 September 2019. The three Championnat National 2 (tier 4) teams entered at this stage. 30 ties were drawn.

The fifth round draw took place on 2 October 2019. The two Championnat National (tier 3) teams entered at this stage. 16 ties were drawn.

The sixth round draw took place on 19 October 2019. Eight ties were drawn.

First round
These matches were played on 25 August 2019.

Second round
These matches were played on 31 August and 1 September 2019, with one game on 8 September 2019.

Third round
These matches were played on 14 and 15 September 2019, with one to be replayed on 22 September 2019.

Fourth round
These matches were played on 28 and 29 September 2019.

Fifth round
These matches were played on 12 and 13 October 2019.

Sixth round
These matches were played on 26 and 27 October 2019.

References

Preliminary rounds